Anopheles belenrae is a species of mosquito. It is found in South Korea.

References

belenrae
Insects described in 2005